Mark Smith may refer to:

Politics 

Mark Smith (Iowa politician) (born 1952), American state representative
Mark Smith (South Carolina politician), American state representative-elect
Mark Smith (Canadian politician) (born 1960), Canadian politician for the Legislative Assembly of Alberta
Mark W. Smith (born 1968), American author, attorney, and political analyst
Marcus A. Smith (1851–1924), known as Mark, U.S. Senator from Arizona

Arts and entertainment
Mark Smith (actor) (born 1969), English bodybuilder and participant on the UK television show Gladiators
Mark Smith (sound engineer) (active since 1987), American sound engineer who won an Academy Award
Mark Coles Smith (born 1987), Australian actor
Mark L. Smith (born 1996), American director and screenwriter
Mark Landon Smith (born 1964), American playwright and actor
Mark T. Smith (born 1968), American painter

Literature 
Mark Smith (author), British author of fantasy game books
Mark Smith (journalist), American journalist
Mark Smith (novelist) (born 1935), American best-selling author
Mark Andrew Smith (born 1979), American comic book author
Mark Haskell Smith (born 1957), American writer
Mark Smith (Australian author), Australian author of young adult novels

Music 
Mark Smith, member of post-rock band Explosions in the Sky (active since 1999)
Mark Smith (musician) (1960–2009), British bassist and record producer
Mark E. Smith (1957–2018), English singer and founder of The Fall
Mark Edgley Smith (1955–2008), British composer

Sports 
Mark Smith (American football) (born 1974), American football player
Mark Smith (American racing driver) (born 1967), American CART competitor
Mark Smith (athlete) (born 1971), English athlete
Mark Smith (basketball) (born 1999), American basketball player
Mark Smith (British racing driver) (born 1965), English BTCC competitor
Mark Smith (cricketer) (born 1975), Zimbabwean cricketer
Mark Smith (fencer) (born 1956), American Olympic fencer
Mark Smith (footballer, born 1960), English football player (Sheffield Wednesday)
Mark Smith (footballer, born October 1961), English football player (West Ham United)
Mark Smith (footballer, born December 1961), English football player and manager
Mark Smith (footballer, born 1964), Scottish football player (Stoke City)
Mark Smith (footballer, born 1973), English football player (Crewe Alexandra)
Mark Smith (ice hockey) (born 1977), Canadian professional ice hockey player
Mark Smith (outfielder) (born 1970), American former professional baseball player
Mark Smith (Pennsylvanian racing driver) (born 1971), racing driver from Pennsylvania
Mark Smith (pitcher) (born 1955), American former professional baseball player
Mark Smith (racing engineer) (born 1961), Formula One designer
Mark Smith (rugby league) (born 1981), English former rugby league player
Bison Smith (Mark Smith, 1973–2011), American professional wrestler

Academia
Marc Smith (palaeographer) (born 1963), French palaeographer
Mark Smith (physicist), British physicist and Vice-Chancellor of Lancaster University
Mark A. Smith (1965–2010), professor of pathology at Case Western Reserve University
Mark M. Smith (active since 1997), American historian
Mark S. Smith (born 1956), American biblical scholar, professor at NYU

Other
Mark Smith (R/C modeling pioneer) (born 1950), designer of radio-controlled model airplanes
Mark C. Smith (1940–2007), founder and chief executive officer of ADTRAN
Mark E. Smith (Civil Air Patrol), National Commander of the Civil Air Patrol
Mark L. Smith (physician) (active since 1999), American physician and plastic surgeon
Mark Alan Smith (born 1949), American serial killer
Mark Smith, creator of the train travel website The Man in Seat Sixty-One

See also
Marc Smith (disambiguation)
Marcus Smith (disambiguation)
Mark Durden-Smith (born 1968), British television presenter